Mummolin (Latin: Mummolinus) (b. circa 500) was a Frankish nobleman.

Life
He was a son of Munderic and wife, daughter of Roman Senator Florentinus and wife Artemia.

Mayor of the Palace of Neustria.

Issue
He fathered: 
 Bodegisel, murdered, married to Chrodoare, of Amay. Some researchers claim that they were the parents of Saint Arnulf of Metz, but proof is lacking.
 Babon, Duke, married and father of: 
 Ermengunde
 Adon
 ..., married to ..., the parents of: 
 Bobo, Duke between 634 and 641
 Adalgisel Grimon

References

Mayors of the Palace
Pippinids
500 births
Year of birth uncertain
Year of death unknown